The Grand Palm Hotel Casino and Convention Resort is a hotel located just a few minutes from the city centre of Gaborone, capital city of Botswana. The hotel is located about 7.6 miles away from Sir Seretse Khama International Airport.

The Grand Palm was the first hotel of the present-day Peermont Group. It was founded in 1995 as a re-launch of Gaborone's former Sheraton Hotel.

References

External links
The Grand Palm Hotel and Casino

Hotels in Botswana
Buildings and structures in Gaborone
Year of establishment missing
Hotels established in 1995
1995 establishments in Botswana